Heinrich XLV, Prince Reuss Younger Line (13 May 1895presumably 1945) was the head of the House of Reuss from 1928 to 1945, as well the last male member of the Reuss-Schleiz branch of the Younger Line.

Early life
Heinrich XLV was born at Ebersdorf, in the Principality of Reuss-Gera (present-day Thuringia), only surviving son of Heinrich XXVII, Prince Reuss Younger Line (1858–1928), (son of Heinrich XIV, Prince Reuss Younger Line, and Duchess Agnes of Württemberg) and his wife, Princess Elise of Hohenlohe-Langenburg (1864–1929), (daughter of Hermann, Prince of Hohenlohe-Langenburg and Princess Leopoldine of Baden).

He attended high school in Dresden and served as a lieutenant in the First World War. After the war he studied in Leipzig, Marburg, Munich and Kiel, literature, music and philosophy.

He was a great theatre lover and supporter and was a director, writer and consultant. In 1923, Heinrich XLV became head of the dramaturgy department at Reussian Theatre in Gera.

Prince Reuss
At the death of his father on 21 November 1928 he became head of the House of Reuss after the Younger and Elder Lines merged, when the Elder Line became extinct in the male line in 1927.

In 1935 he adopted one of his relatives, Prince Heinrich I (1910–1982) a member of the Köstritz branch of the Princely family of Reuss. The adoption took place for inheritance reasons, not for succession rights for the headship of the House of Reuss. In 1939 Heinrich I married Duchess Woizlawa Feodora of Mecklenburg, the niece of Heinrich XLV.

During the 1930s Heinrich XLV became an enthusiastic Nazi sympathizer and member of the Nazi Party. In August 1945 he was Wehrmacht officer, arrested in Ebersdorf by the Soviet military, and is presumed missing. Although he was most likely interned and killed in NKVD special camp Nr. 2 in Buchenwald, his name is not in any of the special camps' lists of the dead. On 5 January 1962 he was declared dead by a court in Büdingen. His entire fortune was seized and confiscated in 1948 by the Soviet Military Administration, including the Ebersdorf Castle, Thallwitz Castle, Osterstein Castle in Gera.

Heinrich XLV remained unmarried and childless and the succession of the House of Reuss passed to Prince Heinrich IV of the Reuss of Köstritz branch.

Ancestry

Notes and sources

The Royal House of Stuart, London, 1969, 1971, 1976, Addington, A. C., Reference: II 224

1895 births
1945 deaths
People from Saalburg-Ebersdorf
People from the Principality of Reuss-Gera
Princes of Reuss
Royalty in the Nazi Party
Heirs apparent who never acceded
People who died in NKVD special camp Nr. 2
German people executed by the Soviet Union
Sons of monarchs